USS Porpoise has been the name of more than one United States navy ship, and may refer to:

 , a schooner built in 1820 and wrecked in 1833
 , a brig in commission from 1836 to 1847, from 1848 to 1852, and from 1853 until lost in 1854
 , a submarine in commission from 1903 to 1919, renamed USS A-6 in 1911
 USS Porpoise (YFB-2047), steamer in commission from 1918 to 1930, originally named 
 , a submarine in commission from 1935 to 1945
 , a patrol yacht acquired by the United States Navy in 1917.

United States Navy ship names